The United Kingdom held a national preselection to choose the song that would go to the Eurovision Song Contest 1965. It was held on 29 January 1965 and presented by David Jacobs.

The BBC internally selected the singer for the second time. They chose a solo female singer, Kathy Kirby, whose looks were compared to Marilyn Monroe and who had just scored four consecutive top 20 hit singles. The song was then selected by viewers of The Kathy Kirby Show on BBC1, casting votes on postcards via post, with the winner "I Belong", receiving 110,495 votes. Kirby released all six songs from the UK final on an Extended Play maxi single BBC TV's A Song for Europe, which reached number 9 in the UK EP top 20 chart. She subsequently re-recorded the winner and the runner up with different arrangements and released these tracks on a single, which peaked at number 36 in the UK singles chart. Chris Andrews had written one of the six finalists, One Day which was recorded by Sandie Shaw with whom he regularly collaborated. Shaw would be the artist selected to represent the UK in the 1967 contest, when again Andrews submitted a song.

At the Eurovision final in Naples, the UK finished in 2nd place for a record fifth time.

Before Eurovision

A Song for Europe 1965

At Eurovision 
"I Belong" won the national and went on to come 2nd in the contest.

At the Eurovision final the BBC TV commentary was provided by David Jacobs with David Gell providing the domestic BBC radio commentary. Ian Fenner provided radio commentary for British Forces Radio.

Voting

References 

1965
Countries in the Eurovision Song Contest 1965
Eurovision
Eurovision